Reverze is an annual international music event held in the Sportpaleis and Lotto Arena in Antwerp, Belgium. Represented music genres are Jumpstyle, hardstyle and hardcore. The previous edition was held on 12 March 2022. Every year, Bass Events designs a poster for Reverze that represents the theme of that year.

Disk jockeys 
Every edition of Reverze is represented by disk jockeys from different countries in Western Europe. In the second (2007) edition there were 40 disk jockeys to play. The sportpaleis is divided into 2 or 3 parts, or areas. Every year an anthem has been made by a DJ.

Anthems

Line-up (2006)

Line-up (2007)

Line-up (2008)

Line-up (2009) - Creation of Life

Line-up (2010) - Revelations

Line-up (2011) - Call of the Visionary

Line-up (2012) - Beyond Belief

Line-up (2013) - Dimensions

Line-up (2014) - Guardians of Time

Line-up (2015) - Illumination

Line-up (2016) - Deception

Line-up (2017) - Interconnected

Line-up (2018) - Essence of Eternity

Line-up (2019) - Edge of Existence

Line-up (2020) - Power of Perception

Line-up (2021) - Wake of the Warrior

Line-up (2022) - Time Will Tell

Line-up (2023) - Synergy

External links 
 Reverze
 Organisatie Bass Events

References

Music festivals in Belgium